The Tempest is a 1963 Australian television play, an adaptation of the play by William Shakespeare. Directed by Alan Burke, it stars Reg Livermore.

Cast
Max Oldaker as Prospero
Joan Morrow as Miranda
Reg Livermore as Ariel
Owen Weingott as Caliban
Walter Sullivan as Antonio	
Ron Haddrick as Alonso		
Walter Pym as Sebastian	
Edmund Pegge as Ferdinand	
Gordon Glenwright as Stephano		
John Armstrong as Trinculo
David Bradbury as Gonzalo
Joy Parkin, Beverly Bohan and Valentine Price as the singers in "The Masque"

Production
Max Oldaker was an actor who had been in retirement in Launceston, Tasmania. He travelled from there to Sydney especially for the play. Reg Livermore says on the first day of rehearsal Oldaker was word perfect. "Max was apprehensive about Shakespeare I guessed," wrote Livermore adding the actor "had been much more at home in the world of musical comedy."

Ariel has two songs. John Antil wrote the music for this which Livermore described as "extremely contemporary but awkward". Livermore rehearsed the songs with Antil and the Sydney Symphony Orchestra.

Keith Bain did choreography for the six dancers. Livermore wore tight shorts and his body was covered in silver paint. His character had to "fly" during the production so he had to perform his scenes off to one side while superimposed on the action. "I had to get my line of sight correct when it came to addressing the other characters of course," wrote Livermore, "which meant I ended up talking to the floor; it was quite tricky and not much fun."

Reception
The Sydney Morning Herald said the trick photography used had "mixed results" but praised the acting.

References

Notes

External links
The Tempest at IMDb

  

1960s Australian television plays
Films based on The Tempest
Films directed by Alan Burke (director)